Albert Bruno Amédée Lantonnois van Rode (19 June 1852 – 2 April 1934) was a Belgian Lieutenant General descendant from an aristocratic family. He was Vice-Governor General of the Congo Free State and later commanded a division during World War I.

Early years

Lantonnois van Rode was born in Mons on 19 June 1852, son of Lambert Lantonnois and Emilie Hubertine Ghislaine van Rode de Schellebrouck.
He entered the Military Academy in April 1870, and was appointed second lieutenant on 8 April 1872.
On 10 December 1877 he was appointed to the first regiment of guides.
He was commander of the 8th Line Regiment (1903–1905) and of the 1st Regiment of Grenadiers (1905–1908).
Lantonnois was commander of the West Flanders Province from 1908 to 1909.

Congo

In November 1905 Lantonnois was stationed as Vice-Governor General of the Congo at Boma, the main port and capital of the colony.
In July 1906 he sent a troop of 20 soldier to Kingoye on the border with the French Congo to establish Belgian authority.
The Baptist Missionary Society (BMS) mission at Yakusu, just below the Stanley Falls, was at first on good terms with the authorities.
However, as their influence grew there were rumours that the British planned to take over the region.
In January 1907 the Lantonnois ordered the district commissioner of the Orientale Province to take vigorous measures to counter the influence of the Protestants.

In June 1908 Lantonnois received a request from Colonel Jan Oomen for permission to be allowed to build a mission at Basankusu. Lantonnois forwarded Oomen's request to the Colonial Ministry in Brussels, where there was a long delay before permission was obtained.
In November 1909 Lantonnois had to deal with a crisis when a British force from Uganda moved into the Mfumbiro region to the north of Lake Kivu. He moved troops into the region and asked permission to attack, which was refused by the Belgian authorities, who correctly considered that arbitration would be a more profitable approach.

Later career

Lantonnois was Inspector-General of the Infantry from 1913 to 1914.
He was Commander of the 6th Army Division from 1914 until January 1915.
He was appointed Lieutenant-General of the Infantry.
Lantonnois van Rode married Marie Thérèse Joséphine Goethals, and they had three children.
He died at Ixelles on 2 April 1934.

Honours
  :
 Grand Officer Order of Leopold
 Grand Officer Order of the Crown
 War Cross
  : Knight of the Order of the African Star

References

Sources

1852 births
1934 deaths
Belgian Army generals of World War I
Congo Free State officials
People from Mons
Commandeurs of the Légion d'honneur
Grand Crosses of the Order of the Crown (Belgium)
Grand Officers of the Order of Saints Maurice and Lazarus
Royal Military Academy (Belgium) alumni